Heřmanice u Oder is a municipality and village in the Nový Jičín District in the Moravian-Silesian Region of the Czech Republic. It has about 400 inhabitants.

Administrative parts
The village of Véska is an administrative part of Heřmanice u Oder.

References

Villages in Nový Jičín District